Palo Duro can refer to:

 Palo Duro Canyon, a canyon system in Texas, U.S.
 Palo Duro Creek, a river in Texas, U.S.
 Palo Duro High School, a high school in the Amarillo Independent School District, Texas, U.S.
 Palo Duro Records, a U.S. record label

See also
 Battle of Palo Duro Canyon